Klas Gösta Natanael Magnusson (13 September 1915 – 25 November 1948) was a Swedish light heavyweight weightlifter. In 1948 he won a European title and a bronze Olympic medal 1948 Summer Olympics in London. An avid ice angler, Magnusson drowned later that year after stepping on weak ice in his home district.

References

1915 births
1948 deaths
Sportspeople from Örebro
Swedish male weightlifters
Weightlifters at the 1948 Summer Olympics
Olympic weightlifters of Sweden
Olympic bronze medalists for Sweden
Olympic medalists in weightlifting
Medalists at the 1948 Summer Olympics
European Weightlifting Championships medalists
20th-century Swedish people